Suvodol may refer to the following places:

North Macedonia
 Suvodol, Demir Hisar, a village in the Pelagonia region
 Suvodol, Makedonski Brod, a village in the Southwestern region
 , a village in Novaci Municipality, in the Pelagonia region
 Suvodol coal mine

Serbia 
 Suvodol (Smederevo), a village in Podunavlje District, Serbia
 Mali Suvodol and Veliki Suvodol, villages in Pirot District, Serbia
 Suvodol monastery, a monastery in Zaječar District, Serbia

See also 
 Battle of Suvodol
 Suhodol (disambiguation)
 Suvi Do (disambiguation)